Sternberg is surname of:

Persons 
 Counts of Sternberg (Šternberkové), Bohemian nobility
 Ben-Zion Sternberg (1894–1962), a Zionist statesman
 Brian Sternberg (1943-2013), an American pole vaulter, world record holder
 Charles Hazelius Sternberg (1850–1943), an American paleontologist
 Charles Mortram Sternberg (1885–1981), an American paleontologist
Dov Sternberg, American karateka
 Elf Sternberg (born 1966), an online erotica author
 Erich Walter Sternberg (1891–1974), a composer
 Eugene Sternberg (1915–2005), architect
 George F. Sternberg (1883–1969), a naturalist and paleontologist
 George Miller Sternberg (1838–1915), an American bacteriologist and physician
 Jacques Sternberg (1923–2006), a French-language writer of science fiction and fantastique
 Janek Sternberg (born 1992), German footballer
 Jonathan Sternberg (1919–2018), American conductor
 Josef von Sternberg (also Jonas Sternberg, 1894–1969), an Austrian-American film director
 Kaspar Maria von Sternberg (1761–1838), a Bohemian palaeontologist (The standard botanical author abbreviation Sternb. is applied to species he described)
 Lev Sternberg (1861–1927), a Ukrainian ethnologist
 Liam Sternberg (born c. 1950), a songwriter and producer
 Nat Sternberg (1942–95), an American molecular biologist
 Ricardo Sternberg, a Brazilian-born Canadian poet
 Richard Sternberg, an American scientist and intelligent design proponent
 Robert Sternberg (born 1949), a psychologist
 Freiherr Roman von Ungern-Sternberg (1886–1921), a Baltic German-Russian lieutenant-general
 Rudy Sternberg, Baron Plurenden (1917–1978), an Austro-British businessman
 Saul Sternberg, an American cognitive psychologist
 Shlomo Sternberg, a Harvard mathematician
 Sir Sigmund Sternberg,(1921-2016) a British philanthropist
 Stephen Sternberg, an American surgical pathologist
 Stuart Sternberg (born 1959), American owner of the Tampa Bay Rays
 Theodor Sternberg (1878–1950), a German philosopher

Sternburg 
 Hermann Speck von Sternburg (1852-1908), German diplomat

Shterenberg 
 David Shterenberg
 Pavel Karlovich Shternberg (1865–1920), a Russian astronomer and Bolshevik revolutionary 
 Yankev Shternberg (1890–1973), a Yiddish writer and theatrical director

See also 
 von Sternberg, Sternberger
  Star of Sternberg
 Sternberg (disambiguation)

German-language surnames
Jewish surnames

fr:Sternberg
hu:Sternberg (egyértelműsítő lap)
nl:Sternberg
ru:Штернберг